Godhra Junction railway station (code GDA) is a railway station in Panchmahal district, Gujarat, India. It serves Godhra city and the surrounding areas like Lunawada and Devgarh-Baria. The station has three platforms. It is un the Vadodara railway division of Western Railway zone of Indian Railways, located on New Delhi–Mumbai main line.

History
The Godhra train burning occurred on the morning of 27 February 2002, in which 59 people died in a fire inside the Sabarmati Express train near the station. The victims included Hindu pilgrims who were returning from the city of Ayodhya after a religious ceremony at the disputed Babri Masjid site.

Major trains
The following MEMU trains start/terminate here:

 69123/24 Godhra – Anand
 69121/22 Godhra – Vadodara
 69145/46 Godhra – Anand
 69125/26 Godhra – Anand
 69147/48 Godhra – Anand

References

Railway stations in Panchmahal district
Vadodara railway division
Railway junction stations in Gujarat